Plymouth Routines In Multivariate Ecological Research (PRIMER) is a statistical package that is a collection of specialist univariate, multivariate, and graphical routines for analyzing species sampling data for community ecology. Types of data analyzed are typically species abundance, biomass, presence/absence, and percent area cover, among others. It is primarily used in the scientific community for ecological and environmental studies.

Multivariate routines include:
grouping (CLUSTER)
sorting (MDS)
principal component identification (PCA)
hypothesis testing (ANOSIM)
sample discrimination (SIMPER)
trend correlation (BEST)
comparisons (RELATE)
diversity, dominance, and distribution calculating
 Permutational multivariate analysis of variance (PERMANOVA)

Routines can be resource intensive due to their non-parametric and permutation-based nature.  Programmed in the VB.Net environment.

References

See also 
 Comparison of statistical packages
 List of statistical packages

Statistical software
Ecology